Brachypeplus is a genus of sap-feeding beetles in the family Nitidulidae. There are at least 2 described species in Brachypeplus.

Species
 Brachypeplus glaber LeConte, 1878
 Brachypeplus habecki

References

 Habeck, Dale H. / Arnett, Ross H. Jr., Michael C. Thomas, Paul E. Skelley, and J. H. Frank, eds. (2002). "Family 77. Nitidulidae Latreille 1802". American Beetles, vol. 2: Polyphaga: Scarabaeoidea through Curculionoidea, 311–315.

Further reading

 Arnett, R. H. Jr., M. C. Thomas, P. E. Skelley and J. H. Frank. (eds.). (21 June 2002). American Beetles, Volume II: Polyphaga: Scarabaeoidea through Curculionoidea. CRC Press LLC, Boca Raton, Florida .
 
 Richard E. White. (1983). Peterson Field Guides: Beetles. Houghton Mifflin Company.

Nitidulidae